Proceedings of the Entomological Society of Washington is a peer-reviewed scientific journal of entomology published by the Entomological Society of Washington. The journal was established in 1886 and is currently published four times per year. The journal is edited by Mark A. Metz.

Abstracting and indexing
According to Journal Citation Reports, its 2020 impact factor is 0.655, ranking 78th out of 101 in the category 'Entomology'. The journal is indexed in the following databases.

References

External links

Entomological Society of Washington website

Entomology journals and magazines
Publications established in 1886
English-language journals
Academic journals published by learned and professional societies of the United States